The Gage Range is a mountain range in Wheeler County, Oregon.

References 

Mountain ranges of Oregon
Mountains of Wheeler County, Oregon